Louis A. "Red" Gebhard (September 15, 1902 – September 19, 1971) was an  American football player and coach. He played college football at Lafayette College. Gebhard was the head football coach at City College of New York (CCNY) from 1945 to 1946.

Head coaching record

References

External links
 

1902 births
1971 deaths
CCNY Beavers football coaches
Lafayette Leopards football players
Philadelphia Quakers (AFL) players
High school football coaches in New Jersey